L.E.F. (short for Loud, Electronic, Ferocious) is a dance and electro album released by Ferry Corsten in May 2006. It was his second studio album that was released under his own name. The word lef also means "guts" (as in: having guts) in Dutch. The album has spawned six singles. The songs include vocals by Simon Le Bon, Howard Jones, Denise Rivera, Debra Andrew, Guru, and Oz.

Track listing 

Bonus tracks (differing by region)

 Daylight
 I Love You
 System F - Insolation (Ferry Corsten's Flashover Remix)
 Prison Break Theme (Ferry Corsten's Breakout Remix)
 "Fire", released in 2005, was the lead track, originally built on the sampled vocals of Duran Duran singer Simon Le Bon from their 1991 hit, "Serious", but later re-recorded by Le Bon. 
 "L.E.F." is a track that was used for Dance Dance Revolution SuperNova.
 Vocals for the track "Watch Out" were done by Ferry Corsten himself.

Bonus tracks 
There are four releases of L.E.F., the only difference between each version is the last bonus track.

 The European version has I Love You. 
 The North American version has Prison Break theme (Ferry Corsten Breakout Mix). 
 The Asian version has System F - Insolation (Ferry Corsten Flashover Mix), plus a bonus DVD with: 
 Fire (videoclip)
 Rock Your Body, Rock (videoclip)
 L.E.F @ Avalon (L.A.) 04/03/2006 (videoclip)
 Interview with Simon Le Bon
 Single interview
 The version for other regions features Daylight as the bonus track.

Charts

References

External links 
 Official homepage

2006 albums
Ferry Corsten albums